Kilmarnock East and Hurlford is one of the nine wards used to elect members of the East Ayrshire council. It elects four councillors using the single transferable vote electoral system and covers an area with a population of 15,570 people.

The area has produced strong results for both Labour and the Scottish National Party (SNP) with the former holding two seats between 2007 and 2017 and the latter taking half the seats at every election.

Boundaries
The ward was created following the Fourth Statutory Reviews of Electoral Arrangements ahead of the 2007 Scottish local elections. As a result of the Local Governance (Scotland) Act 2004, local elections in Scotland would use the single transferable vote electoral system from 2007 onwards so Kilmarnock East and Hurlford was formed from an amalgamation of several previous first-past-the-post wards. It contained all of the former South New Farm Loch ward as well as parts of the former North New Farm Loch and Dean, Kilmarnock Central East, Kilmarnock Central South, Crookedholm, Moscow, Galston West and Hurlford  North and Hurlford wards. Initially, Kilmarnock East and Hurlford included the easternmost part of Kilmarnock including the neighbourhoods of New Farm Loch, Beansburn and Townholm as well as the towns of Hurlford and Crookedholm. Following the Fifth Statutory Reviews of Electoral Arrangements ahead of the 2017 Scottish local elections, the ward's western boundary was moved east to run along the B7038 instead of the Kilmarnock Water and Craufurdland Water to take in Dean Castle Country Park.

Councillors

Election results

2022 election

2017 election

2017 by-election

2012 election

2007 election

Notes

References

Wards of East Ayrshire
Politics of Kilmarnock